The English Curling Association (ECA) is the national governing body of the sport of curling in England. While the ECA is a full member of the World Curling Federation, it also is a member of British Curling which manages Great Britain's Olympic and Paralympic curling programs. 

There is currently only one dedicated curling facility in England; The Flower Bowl in Lancashire., home to Preston Curling Club, following the close of Fenton's Rink at the end of the 2021-22 season. Curling can also be found semi-regularly at Cambridge Ice Rink, home to the newly formed Cambridge Curling Club.

There are a number of other clubs in the North of England, such as Glendale, who play matches in rinks across the Scottish Border. Saint George's Curling Club also offers English curlers living in Scotland a club, though they are not focussed at any one rink.

References

External links 

 Official website

Curling in England
Curling governing bodies
Sports governing bodies in England